Odontognathus is a genus of longfin herrings in the family Pristigasteridae. Currently, three species are recognized for this genus, all of which are restricted to tropical waters of the Western Hemisphere.

Species
 Odontognathus compressus Meek & Hildebrand, 1923 (Caribbean longfin herring)
 Odontognathus mucronatus Lacépède, 1800 (Guiana longfin herring)
 Odontognathus panamensis (Steindachner, 1876) (Panama longfin herring)

References
 

Pristigasteridae
Ray-finned fish genera
Marine fish genera
Taxa named by Bernard Germain de Lacépède